Rona Mayer (born 11 July 1973) is an Israeli former professional tennis player.

Mayer played in two Federation Cup doubles rubbers for Israel in 1989, partnering junior teammate Limor Zaltz, for a loss to South Korea and a win against Jamaica.

Across 1989 and 1990, she featured in several overseas professional ITF tournaments while playing juniors. She and Zaltz were the girls' doubles champions at the 1990 Australian Open.

After 1990 she played in only Israeli satellites and in 1994 she transferred to Harvard as a sophomore student.

ITF finals

Doubles: 1 (0–1)

See also
List of Israel Fed Cup team representatives

References

External links
 
 
 

1973 births
Living people
Israeli female tennis players
Australian Open (tennis) junior champions
Grand Slam (tennis) champions in girls' doubles
Harvard Crimson women's tennis players